Laurent David (born January 9, 1971 in Saint-Brieuc) is a French former professional footballer. He is currently a head coach for Stade Brestois 29 reserves.

David played on the professional level in Ligue 1 for FC Martigues and in Ligue 2 for Stade Brestois 29, CS Sedan Ardennes, FC Mulhouse, AS Beauvais Oise, Amiens SC and Grenoble Foot 38.

1971 births
Living people
French footballers
Ligue 1 players
Ligue 2 players
Championnat National players
Stade Brestois 29 players
CS Sedan Ardennes players
FC Martigues players
FC Mulhouse players
AS Beauvais Oise players
Amiens SC players
Grenoble Foot 38 players
Stade Plabennécois players
Association football midfielders
Footballers from Brittany
Sportspeople from Côtes-d'Armor